Ben Field (pseudonym of Moe Bragin), (October 15, 1900 – June 14, 1986), was an American writer who authored four novels and numerous short stories,  poems, and essays.

Life and career
Moe Bragin was five years old when he arrived at Ellis Island on March 25, 1906 with his then 26-year-old mother, Bessie, and a younger brother Jacob. They were to join their father, Joseph Bragin, who had come earlier. He attended the New York City public schools and got his baccalaureate degree from the City College of New York in 1923 and his Master of Arts degree from Columbia University in 1928. Although primarily a writer, he taught for many years at the Hebrew Institute of Boro Park. In earlier years and in the summers, when a steady income was needed, he worked variously as a machinist, a logger, a farmhand.

He started writing during the Depression Years using his own name and started to use the pseudonym, Ben Field, in 1934. Early in his career, while still writing in his own name, he was included in the 1932 "Honor Roll" of distinctive short story writers. Short stories cited as distinctive were "Cow", "Flowers and Weeds", "It Isn't Pie", "New Tuxedo", "No Groundhog's Life", "Praying Mantis", and "We Take Mama Out".  The first three were included in the "Honor Roll."

The thirties and forties was a productive period for him as a creative author. His early reputation was established by short stories that are anthologized with the likes of William Faulkner, Ernest Hemingway, Katherine Porter, Eudora Welty and John Steinbeck. His first major work was a collection of short stories, The Cock's Funeral, published in 1937 with an introduction by  Erskine Caldwell. This was followed by three novels, Outside Leaf, Piper Tompkins, The Last Freshet, all published in the forties. Although he continued to write short stories, it was not until 1971 that he wrote his fifth novel, Jacob's Son He died in South Pasadena, California in June 1986. He was a member of the League of American Writers.

Research on Ben Field and his works
Ben Field was one of the five novelists featured in Betty Ann Burch's The Assimilation Experience of Five American White Ethnic Novelists of the Twentieth Century. Originally published in 1990 by Garland Publishing, Inc. and published as an e-edition in 2017, this book is based on Burch's 1973 dissertation at the University of Minnesota. She writes an extensive biography of Field, based on correspondence with him, and does a critical analysis of Field's work. Burch's papers pertaining to Ben Field are archived at the "Special Collections" of the Elmer L. Anderson Library at the University of Minnesota.

With the advent of the Internet, a lot of information has surfaced regarding Ben Field's works. A recent article by Michael Whitworth describes how the Scottish poet Hugh Macdiarmid extensively used and adapted prose from sources that include Ben Field's (Moe Bragin's) essay "Obituary for Jewish Art Theater" for MacDiarmid's poem, 'Etika Preobrazhennavo Erosa'. Some personal correspondence between Ben Field and novelist Jack Conroy are preserved among Conroy's papers at the special collections of the Newberry Library in Chicago, Illinois.. Some recent books on the literary left of the twentieth century cite a few of Moe Bragin's writings.

Published works
Major Works
 The Cock's Funeral.  With an Introduction by Erskine Caldwell. NY: International Publishers, 1937.
 Outside Leaf.  NY: Reynal & Hitchcock, 1943.
 Piper Tompkins.  Garden City, NY: Doubleday & Company, Inc., 1946.
 The Last Freshet.  Garden City, NY: Doubleday & Company, Inc., 1948.
 Jacob's Son.  NY: Crown Publishers, Inc., 1971.

Short Stories and Poems
 "The Japanese Kimono" in Copy, 1930: Stories, Plays, Poems, and Essays. NY: E. Appleton and Company, 1930, pp. 38–47.
 "Work" in Prairie Schooner, Vol. 4, Number 3, Summer 1930, p. 144. (Also published in The Menorah Journal, Vol. XIX, Number 4, June 1931, pp. 447–452.)
 "A New York Form" in The Stratford Magazine, Vol. V, Number 6, July 1930, 00. 20–24.
 "From an Eastern Farm: Night – The Farmer's Daughter" in Poetry: A Magazine of Verses, Vol. XXXVII, Number IV, January 1931, 00. 200–201.
 "Cake" in The Midland, Vol. XVII, Number IV, January/February 1931, pp. 60.
 "Cow" in The Hound & Horn, Vol. IV, Number 4, July–September 1931, p. 556–568. Anthologized in Granville Hicks et al., eds., Proletarian Literature in the United States: An Anthology, NY: International Publishers, 1935, pp. 71–79; as well as in Jack Salzman, ed. Years of Protest: A Collection of American Writings of the 1930s, NY: Pegasus, 1967, pp. 311–319.
 "It Isn't Pie" in Clay, Autumn 1931, p. 27.
 "New Tuxedo" in Pagany', Oct-Dec 1931, p. 104.
 "In Egypt" in Dorothy Scarborough, ed., Selected Short Stories of Today. NY: Farrar & Rinehart, 1935, pp. 174–188.  (Also published in The Massachusetts Review: A Quarterly of Literature, the Arts and Public Affairs, Vol. 1, Number 3, May 1960, pp. 417–437.)
 "We Take Mama Out" in Opportunity: A Journal of Negro Life, February 1, 1932.
 "The Praying Mantis" in The New Republic, February 3, 1932, p. 322.
 "Flowers and Weeds" in Midland, Vol. 19, March–April 1932, p. 50.
 "No Groundhog's Life" in Pagany, April–June 1932, p. 93. 
 "The Sheep Dip" in Partisan Review, Vol. I, Number 1, February–March 1934, pp. 24–31.
 "The Eclipse" in Partisan Review, Vol. I, Number 3, June–July 1934, pp. 27–29.
 "The Grasshopper is Stirring!" in Granville Hicks et al., eds., Proletarian Literature in the United States: An Anthology, NY: International Publishers, 1935, pp. 71–79.
 "The Market" in John Lehmann, ed., New Writing, London: Lawrence and Wishart, 1937, pp. 225–234.
 "Whom the Ox Gored" in New Directions in Prose &Poetry, 1941 Mount Vernon: New Directions, 1941, pp. 391–406.
 "The New Housekeeper" in Nicholas Moore, ed., The Book of Modern American Short Stories, London: Editions Poetry, 1945, pp. 149–160.
 "An Answer for My Uncle" in Kerker Quinn and Charles Shattuck, eds., Accent Anthology, NY: Harcourt, Brace and Company, 1946, pp. 87–98.
 "A Lesson" in Joseph Gaer, ed., Our Lives: American Labor Stories, NY: Boni and Gaer, 1948, pp. 96–102.
 "The Little Jew, My Brother" in The California Quarterly, Vol. 3, Number 4, 1955, pp. 3–19.
 "Maxie Ganew" in Maxim Lieber, ed., Das Amerikanische Jahrhundert, Leipzig: Paul List Verlag, 1957, pp. 210–229.  Trans. Arthur Bagemühl.
 "Three Sisters" in Massachusetts Review: A Quarterly of Literature, the Arts and Public Affairs, Volume 1, Number 3, May 1960, pp. 417–437.

Essays
 "Obituary for Jewish Art Theater" in The Hound & Horn, Vol. XX, January–March 1932, pp. 283–287.
 "Journal of a Tour in America" in The American Mercury,'' Vol, XXVI, June 1932, pp. 199–208.
 "Israel Zangwill: A Vital Force" in Morris U. Schappes, ed., "Jewish Currents" Reader, NY: Jewish Currents, Inc., 1966, pp. 240–246.

References

20th-century American novelists
Writers from Brooklyn
1901 births
1986 deaths
American male novelists
20th-century American short story writers
20th-century American male writers
Novelists from New York (state)
Emigrants from the Russian Empire to the United States